

Chinese language 
Pinyin (Hànyǔ Pīnyīn) is the official romanization system for Standard Chinese in China, Singapore and (since 2009) Taiwan.

Pinyin can also refer to other transcription systems used in China:

 For varieties of Chinese:
 Tongyong Pinyin, a romanization of Mandarin Chinese formerly used in Taiwan
 Wēituǒmǎ Pīnyīn, the Chinese name for the Wade–Giles system of Mandarin language romanization
 Cantonese Pinyin, a standard romanization of Cantonese used in Hong Kong
 Yēlǔ pīnyīn, romanization systems of Asian languages developed at Yale:
 Yale romanisation of Cantonese
 Yale romanisation of Mandarin
 Yale romanisation of Korean
 For other languages of China:
 Tibetan pinyin, the official transcription system for Standard Tibetan in China
 Uyghur pinyin, one of the official transcription systems for the Uyghur language in China

Other 
 Pinyin language, a Niger–Congo language spoken by some 27,000 people in the Northwest region of Cameroon